Gheorghe Sencovici (1 July 1945 – 9 May 2006) was a Romanian former sports shooter. He competed in the skeet event at the 1968 Summer Olympics. He was married to the singer Margareta Pâslaru. The couple left Romania with their daughter in 1983 and resided in Summit, New Jersey ever since.

References

1945 births
2006 deaths
Romanian male sport shooters
Olympic shooters of Romania
Shooters at the 1968 Summer Olympics
Sportspeople from Bucharest